The Best of Led Zeppelin is a two-volume best-of compilation album series by English rock group Led Zeppelin; containing selections from all of the band's studio albums it was released by Atlantic Records. Volume one, Early Days was released on November 23, 1999; volume two, Latter Days, was released on March 21, 2000. Early Days is composed of tracks from the period in the band's history dating 1968 to 1971 and doesn't use a traditional "greatest hits" format as Led Zeppelin largely avoided single releases. (The band never had a Billboard No. 1 single.) Latter Days covered 1973 to 1979. Early Days debuted at #71 on the Billboards Pop Albums chart and Latter Days debuted at #81. A combined disc set, called Early Days and Latter Days, was released on November 19, 2002. Both Early Days and Early Days and Latter Days were certified platinum by the Recording Industry Association of America.

Both volumes are now out of print, and were replaced with the 2007 two-disc compilation Mothership.


Early Days

Track listing

This enhanced CD contains 1969 television footage from Sweden of the band miming to "Communication Breakdown".

Year-end charts

Latter Days

Track listing

This enhanced CD contains a video of a live performance of "Kashmir" from Earls Court in 1975 matched to the studio track.

Box set

Appearance
The sleeve that holds the two CDs is made of cardstock. The cover of the sleeve is mainly occupied by the same photo from the cover of Early Days. It features the members of Led Zeppelin in late Apollo mission astronaut suits in front of a starry background and a Led Zeppelin logo. The logo behind them shows many space-related images, but the only one wholly visible is the image of the moon's face with a space capsule stuck in its eye taken from the early silent movie A Trip to the Moon.

On the back of the sleeve is an array of information split up into two columns. On the left column, there is a photograph of the cover of Latter Days. It features the same astronaut suits, but the photos were taken later and so the members of Led Zeppelin are older. In the logo is an image of Saturn and behind all of the foreground is an image of Earth taken from space. Below that is the information about Atlantic. On the right column is a synopsis of the tracks on both discs.

Early Days disc
Early Days is packaged in a plastic jewel compact disc case. Much of the background is a drawing of stars, yet inside the case and behind the CD is an image of an artist's rendition of a supernova, apparently airbrushed. On the backside of the case is a list of the tracks. The background of the back cover appears to be a slightly out-of-focus photograph, likely taken by an amateur photographer.

The Early Days liner notes begin with the cover. On the cover is the same image that appears on the foreground of the sleeve. Inside the booklet is first a summary of the tracks, and then photos of the band ranging from 1969 to 1972. Then after that is a list of their albums, and the back page is a list of the band members, design and artwork credits, and information about the Enhanced CD capabilities on Early Days.

Latter Days disc
The packaging for Latter Days mirrors that of Early Days. The four band members are pictured in the same Apollo space suits in the same order, but they are older. Much of the background is of Earth as viewed from orbit. There is a picture of Saturn in place of the picture of the moon with the ship in its eye. Behind the CD is an image of the Eagle Nebula.

The liner notes are just like those of Early Days, except for the fact that the images range from the years 1973 to 1979.

Enhanced CD
Both the Early Days CD and the Latter Days CD are enhanced so they can play extra content on a computer. On Early Days, a music video of the song "Communication Breakdown" is included. On Latter Days, a video of the song "Kashmir" is included.

Personnel
Led Zeppelin
John Bonham – drums, percussion
John Paul Jones – bass guitar, keyboards, acoustic guitar, recorders
Jimmy Page – electric and acoustic guitars, mandolin, production
Robert Plant – vocals, harmonica

Additional musicians
Sandy Denny – vocals on "The Battle of Evermore"
Ian Stewart – piano on "Rock and Roll"

References

Albums produced by Jimmy Page
Compilation album series
Led Zeppelin compilation albums
1999 greatest hits albums
2000 greatest hits albums
Atlantic Records compilation albums
Folk rock compilation albums